Dimitrij is a Czech-language grand opera in four acts by Antonín Dvořák (B. 127, Op. 64), set to a libretto by Marie Červinková-Riegrová, with a plot derived from Ferdinand Mikovec's Dimitr Ivanovič, itself based upon Friedrich Schiller's incomplete Demetrius. The work was first performed in Prague in 1882.

Composition and performance history
The libretto was originally written for Karel Šebor to set, but he proved highly unwilling to do so, so Červinková-Riegrová offered her work to Dvořák, who proved much more enthusiastic, but requested many modifications to the libretto as it stood, including the introduction of more opportunities for ensembles. The form of the opera was largely in imitation of Eugène Scribe. Dvořák began composition during May 1881, with an interruption in October 1881 to write a string quartet for the Hellmesberger Quartet. After an initial failed attempt, the Quartet Movement in F major, the String Quartet No. 11 was completed in November 1881, allowing work on the opera to resume.

The first performance in the United States was on March 24, 1984, in a concert format presented at Carnegie Hall in New York City by conductor Robert Bass and the Collegiate Chorale with Martina Arroyo as Marina.

With Dimitrij, Dvořák scored a great popular success, though he later persuaded his librettist to rework act 4, and this revised version was given in 1885. Later still, he heavily reworked the opera along Wagnerian lines, and this radical version was performed during 1892.

Roles

Synopsis

After the death of Boris, the Russian people are split between the followers of the Godunov family (led by Shuisky) whilst others (led by General Basmanov) support Dmitrij, assumed son of Ivan the Terrible and husband to the Polish Marina of the Sandomir family. If Marfa (widow of Ivan the Terrible) publicly recognises Dimitrij as her son, he will triumph. Despite knowing that this is not the case, she does this to use him as a pawn for her revenge on her old enemies.

In act 2, Dimitrij is seen breaking up altercations between Poles and Russians and rescuing Xenie, with whom he forms a relationship. He also breaks up a conspiracy led by Shuisky, who is to be executed.

In act 3, Xenie begs Dimitrij to have mercy on Shuisky. Marina realises the link between the two and reveals Dimitrij's humble origins, but he nevertheless intends to remain ruler.

Finally, in act 4, Xenie mourns her betrayed love. Marina, however, has Xenie killed and reveals Dimitrij's origins. Dimitrij is finally shot by Shuisky.

References

External links

Info on a comprehensive Dvorak site
Dimitrij (1946 recording; reconstructed 1995) (Youtube)

1882 operas
1892 operas
Cultural depictions of Russian monarchs
Czech-language operas
Grand operas
Operas based on actual events
Operas based on real people
Operas
Operas about politicians
Operas based on plays
Operas by Antonín Dvořák
Operas set in Russia
Operas set in the 17th century